Browns is an unincorporated community in Scott County, in the U.S. state of Missouri.

Browns was founded in the 1910s and once known as Brown’s Spur, being named after a canal building supervisor who had a railway spur built at the location to aid in the delivery of materials.

References

Unincorporated communities in Scott County, Missouri
Unincorporated communities in Missouri